The Anchorage, also known as William Elliott House, in Beaufort, South Carolina, is a house built in 1776. It was listed on the National Register of Historic Places in 1971.

It is included in the Beaufort Historic District, which is a National Historic Landmark District.

In 2014 the house was purchased by Frank and Amy Lesesne.

References

Houses on the National Register of Historic Places in South Carolina
Houses in Beaufort, South Carolina
National Register of Historic Places in Beaufort County, South Carolina
Historic district contributing properties in South Carolina